Kurt Elimä (born 24 August 1939) is a Swedish former ski jumper who competed internationally from 1963 to 1968. He finished seventh in the individual normal hill event at the 1964 Winter Olympics in Innsbruck.

Elimä's best career finish international was fourth in an individual normal hill event in Austria in 1966.

"Kurre" won five Swedish Championships, participated in two Olympics (1964 and 1968) and one world cup. He finished third in the classic Garmisch-Partenkirchen and won the Swiss ski weeks. He was a Swedish champion in 1963–1965, 1967 and 1969 and received Stora Grabbars Märke in 1969.

Biography
Kurt grew up in Korpilombolo, he has 12 siblings and was the second oldest.

Kurt is from a family of ski jumpers, with several brothers who have jumped including Lennart Elimä (who won Swedish Champions 1978) is one of those who also competed at a high level, and in the 1960s their father Lorenz Elimä built a jump on a hill in Malmberget.

Kurt started with a ski jumping club in Koskullskulle AIF; he also competed for the second tusk in his career as IFK Kiruna and Malmbergets AIF.

In Kaif (Koskullskulle AIF), he has also been active after he stopped competing, he has trained ski jumper Jan Boklöv who is the founder of V style that today is the basic style of ski jumping.

Kurt currently lives in Malmberget, and has put in as coach of Kaif.

References

External links

 https://web.archive.org/web/20110823161758/http://olympicairport.drift.senselogic.se/5.aad0b10833d63e5c800018696.html
 https://web.archive.org/web/20100522044516/http://www.skidor.com/sv/SvenskaSkidforbundet/Historikochstatistik/Svenskamastare/Backenordiskkombination/
 http://www.nsd.se/arkiv/2006/02/02/Sport/3467161/Backhoppningen-%E4r-d%F6d.aspx (Swedish text)

1939 births
Living people
People from Pajala Municipality
Ski jumpers at the 1964 Winter Olympics
Ski jumpers at the 1968 Winter Olympics
Swedish male ski jumpers
Olympic ski jumpers of Sweden
Sportspeople from Norrbotten County